Biuro Odszkodowań Wojennych BOW (ang. Polish War Reparations Bureau) - institution established in 1945 by the Presidium of the Council of Ministers in Warsaw to assess the war losses suffered by Poland during the Second World War in 1939-1945. The office dealt with determining and estimating the war losses suffered by the Polish state, as well as private individuals in the field of material and cultural goods, coordinating work related to the compensation and recovery.

History
The Military Compensation Center was first established institution at September 27, 1944 before the end of World War II, by decree Polish Committee of National Liberation. In 1947 Biuro Odszkodowań Wojennych prepared a report "Report on the losses and damages of war in Poland in 1939-1945" describing the number of material and biological Polish losses during the war.

During the war, Poland lost 6,028,000 persons of its community, of these 616,000 on account of immediate military action.

The losses sustained by the railways are put at 84%, those of the postal system and telecommunications — at 62%, those of the education system — at 60%, the material cultural assets were lost in 43%, the damage to forests — so hard to ameliorate — is calculated at 28%. But that is not the point of gravity. Poland has over a million citizens infected with tuberculosis, half a million invalids incapable of working, 22% of all Polish citizens have perished.

References

Bibliography

Links 
 Description of materials collected by the Office of War Compensation at the Presidium of the Council of Ministers in Warsaw archived in the Archives of Modern Records.
 Report on the losses and damages of war in Poland in the years 1939-1945 in the Sejm library.
 'Report on Poland's losses and war damage in 1939-1945' in three language versions: Polish, German and English (in PDF format) on the Mularczyk's website.

1945 in Poland